The New York City steam systems include Con Edison's Steam Operations, and other smaller systems that provide steam to New York University and Columbia University. Many individual buildings in New York have their own steam systems.

Con Edison's Steam Operations

Con Edison's Steam Operations is a district heating system which carries steam from generating stations under the streets to heat and cool buildings and businesses in Manhattan. Some New York businesses and facilities also use steam for cleaning and disinfection.

The New York Steam Company began providing service in lower Manhattan on March 3, 1882. Today, Consolidated Edison operates the largest commercial steam system in the world (larger than the next nine combined). The organization within Con Edison responsible for the system's operation, known as Steam Operations, provides steam service to over 1,700 commercial and residential customers in Manhattan from Battery Park to 96th Street uptown on the west side, and 89th Street on the east side of Manhattan. Roughly  of steam flow through the system every year.

Uses
Steam provides heat and cooling to many buildings in New York.  The steam system also provides humidity to art museums, steam cleaning for restaurants to clean dishes, and other uses.

Environmental effects
Approximately 30% of the ConEd steam system's installed capacity and 50% of the annual steam generated comes from cogeneration. Cogeneration and Heat Recovery Steam Generation (HRSG) significantly increase the fuel efficiency of cogenerated electricity and thereby reduce the emission of pollutants, such as NOx, sulfur dioxide, carbon dioxide, and particulate matter, as well as the city's carbon footprint. Con Edison is promoting the use of steam for cooling in the summer months, something that can be accomplished with the installation of absorption chillers. Such trigeneration systems reduce peak electrical loads and save construction costs associated with expanding electrical infrastructure.

Clouds of condensation are vented from manholes in Manhattan through orange and white "chimneys". This can be caused by external water being boiled by contact with the steam pipes or by leaks in the steam system itself.

At least twelve steam pipe explosions have occurred in New York City since 1987. The most recent major incident was the 2018 steam pipe explosion which occurred in the Flatiron District and forced the evacuation of 49 buildings. The explosion released concrete, asphalt, "asbestos-containing material" and mud into the air. The asbestos cleared out of the air to safe-level. A previous incident was the 2007 New York City steam explosion, and another on June 28, 1996, at a plant on East 75th Street.

Plants

East 74th Street Station (at FDR Drive) 
60th Street Station (at York Ave.) 
59th Street Station (at 11th Ave.) 
East River Station (14th St. and FDR) (cogeneration) 
BNYCP Plant (Brooklyn Navy Yard Cogeneration Partners) (cogeneration) 
Ravenswood "A" House Steam Station (Queens)

See also
Cogeneration
District heating
Holly Steam Combination Company
2007 New York City steam explosion

References

External links
Con Edison Steam Operations
Con Ed History
Gotham Gazette Article on Steam
Why District Steam Heat Flopped in Gilded Age New York

District heating in the United States
New York City infrastructure
Air pollution in New York City
Steam power
Consolidated Edison